Yeehaw Junction is a census-designated place (CDP) in Osceola County, Florida, United States. As of the 2010 census, it had a population of 240. The area was confused with Buenaventura Lakes CDP in the 2000 census, and the correct data for the area was not recorded.

Yeehaw Junction is part of the Orlando–Kissimmee Metropolitan Statistical Area. The Destiny development is planned nearby.

Geography 
The location was named after the Yeehaw station on the Florida East Coast Railway's Kissimmee Valley Line, which passed through Yeehaw Junction from 1915 to 1947.

History

Some say the community's name comes from the fact locals would yell "Yeehaw!", while others believe the name is derived from the Creek language word meaning "wolf". According to town historians and several original newspaper articles that are displayed at the Desert Inn and Restaurant, the town was originally named "Jackass Junction" or "Jackass Crossing". This name was given to the four-corner site back in the early 1930s, when local ranchers rode on burros to visit the Desert Inn (then the local brothel). As the 1950s approached, the Florida legislature felt that a name change was due in light of the construction of Florida's Turnpike through the center of the community in 1957, resulting in renaming the town to its present-day name.

Biological warfare experiment
In late 1968 the Deseret Test Center conducted a biological warfare experiment at Yeehaw Junction. The experiment was part of Project 112 and was labelled DTC Test 69–75. Stem rust, referred to as "Agent TX", was tested to determine its effectiveness against a wheat crop in time of war. The tests were conducted over a period of one month from October 31 to December 1, 1968. Live agent was sprayed by a U.S. Air Force McDonnell Douglas F-4 Phantom fighter jet on seven occasions and dead agent, consisting of spores that were killed by a gaseous mixture of ethylene oxide, was sprayed on four occasions.
The stated objective of Deseret Test Center (DTC) Test 69-75 was to investigate the effectiveness of the F-4/A/B and 45Y-2/TX weapon systems to reduce Soviet wheat crop yields in selected geographic areas. The objective was subdivided into other tasks: determine the downwind travel of Agent TX released from the A/B 45Y-2 spray tank, estimate the yield reduction and loss of wheat crops attacked by the weapon system, study the effectiveness of killed TX as a simulant for Agent TX, and evaluate the adequacy to predict downwind dosages of Agent TX.
The tests were unknown to local residents and officials until October 2002 when U.S. senator Bill Nelson demanded details of the tests from the U.S. Department of Defense after knowledge of the test was eventually revealed during a larger congressional inquiry of potential effects on participating veterans of chemical and biological testing. Eglin Air Force Base, Avon Park Air Force Range, Panama City, Belle Glade, and Fort Pierce, were additional sites in Florida of biological agent production and testing.

Demographics

In 2010 Yeehaw Junction had a population of 240.  The racial and ethnic composition of the population was 89.2% non-Hispanic white, 1.3% Native American, 0.4% Asian (one person), 2.9% reporting two or more races and 6.3% Hispanic or Latino.

Present day

The Yeehaw Junction exit on Florida's Turnpike is still active. It was once known as a major stopping point for tourists to purchase conditional discount tickets for various tourist attractions in the Orlando area, but Yeehaw Junction's ticket booth has since closed down. The Turnpike exit links with State Road 60, an important traffic route going from Vero Beach on the Atlantic to Tampa and St. Petersburg on the Gulf Coast. The Turnpike exit is the southern end of the longest stretch of limited-access highway without an exit in the United States (the next interchange to the north being 48.9 miles away at Kissimmee/St. Cloud) and the northern end of the second-longest such stretch (the next exit to the south being 40.5 miles away at Fort Pierce).

Since the population is not large enough to support its own schools, children in the community can choose to attend Osceola County School District, which may be over an hour's bus ride for students (the nearest public school is located in St. Cloud), or be bused to closer schools in Indian River County or Okeechobee County.

The Desert Inn closed temporarily in June 2018. There are plans to reopen it as a museum, restaurant and motel after restorations. 
The Desert Inn was largely destroyed on December 22, 2019, when an 18-wheeler lost control on a nearby road and crashed into the building at highway speeds. Recently, the owners have been able to save what was not destroyed and are planning on restoring the site.

References

Census-designated places in Osceola County, Florida
Greater Orlando
Census-designated places in Florida